"Prinz Eugen, der edle Ritter" (Prince Eugene, the Noble Knight) is an Austrian-German folksong about the victory of Prince Eugene of Savoy in 1717 during the Austro-Turkish War of 1716–1718. It tells of the bravery of Prince Eugene, his companion Prince Ludwig who lost his life in the battle, and their soldiers in defeating the Turks and recovering the city of Belgrade for the Holy Roman Empire. The oldest known record of the song comes from a handwritten songbook of 1719. The lyricist is unknown.

Theme
The song is a narrative of the Siege of Belgrade (1717). The text diverts from historical accuracy in two aspects. The day of the final assault on the defenders is given as the 21 August although it was 16 August. Second, the song tells of the death of one Prince Louis (Prinz Ludewig). Eugene had two brothers named Louis but none of them fell at Belgrade. The younger one, Louis Julius (1660–1683) who had entered Imperial service prior to Eugene was killed by Crimean Tatars at Petronell, whereas the older one, Louis Thomas (1657–1702) had died at the Siege of Landau (1702).

Background and legacy
The author of the song is unknown. Josef Strauss composed in 1865 his Prinz Eugen March, Op. 186, for the unveiling of a statue of Prince Eugene at the Heldenplatz in Vienna; it uses elements of the folksong.

Lyrics

References

External links
Notes and text
Lyrics in German and Latin, ingeb.org
Lyrics and history in German and English, Jean-Louis Vial
A more poetic translation

Ballads
Austrian songs
German folk songs
18th-century songs
German patriotic songs
Cultural depictions of Prince Eugene of Savoy